Lisleherad Station was a railway station serving Lisleherad in Notodden, Norway on Tinnoset Line from 1909 to the line closed in 1991.

Designed by Thorvald Astrup it opened on 9 August 1909 as Lilleherred, changing to Litleherad on 1 January 1922 and to Lisleherad on 15 October 1922. It was staffed until 1960. After the railway closed it was sold as a residence.

References

External links

 Norsk Jernbaneklubb entry

Railway stations on the Tinnoset Line
Railway stations in Notodden
Railway stations opened in 1919
Railway stations closed in 2004
Disused railway stations in Norway
1919 establishments in Norway
2004 disestablishments in Norway